Joel Clarke-Khan (born 30 September 1999) is an English athlete specialising in the high jump.

He became British champion when winning the high jump event at the 2020 British Athletics Championships with a jump of 2.18 metres.

References

Living people
1999 births
English male high jumpers
British male high jumpers
British Athletics Championships winners
Athletes (track and field) at the 2022 Commonwealth Games